Martín Andrés Silva Leites (born 25 March 1983) is a Uruguayan professional footballer who plays as a goalkeeper for Paraguayan side Club Libertad and the Uruguay national team.

Club career

Defensor Sporting
Silva has played most of his professional career in Defensor Sporting, starting in 2002.

Olimpia
In August 2011, he signed a four-year contract with Paraguayan club Olimpia. He made his league debut for the club on 7 August 2011, going the full ninety in a 4-0 home victory over 3 de Febrero. Silva scored his first league goal for the club on 9 December 2012, scoring a penalty in the 53rd minute of a 1-0 victory over Sol de América. In November 2013, Silva controversially rescinded his contract with Olimpia after a successful Copa Libertadores and being loved by the fans.

Vasco da Gama
In December 2013, he signed a four-year contract with Brazilian club Vasco da Gama. Silva made his competitive debut for the club on 26 January 2014 in a 6-0 victory over Friburguense during the Campeonato Carioca, playing all ninety minutes and keeping a clean sheet. Silva made his Série B debut for the club three months later, appearing on matchday one and picking up a yellow card in a 1–1 draw with América Mineiro. Silva would go on to make over 200 appearances in all competitions for the club during his four-year spell.

Libertad
In December 2018, Silva moved back to Paraguay, signing a three-year contract with Libertad. He made his league debut for the club on 22 January 2019, playing all ninety minutes in a 2-0 defeat to Sol de América.

International career
Silva has played for the Uruguay under-17 team and the Uruguay under-20 team from 1999 to 2003. He won his first international cap for Uruguay in a friendly match against Algeria, on 12 August 2009. He was included in the starting line-up of players for that match. Silva was also Uruguay's third choice goalkeeper in the 2010 FIFA World Cup and the 2011 Copa América. He played for the national team against Tahiti on 23 June 2013, when Uruguay defeated the Tahitians 8–0 in the Confederations Cup, and had his third and fourth games against Jordan, when Uruguay won its place for the 2014 World Cup, on 13 and 20 November 2013, respectively.

In 2018, he was selected in Uruguay's 23 men squad for the 2018 FIFA World Cup in Russia. However, Silva didn't appear in any matches during the tournament. Silva was then included in Uruguay's squad for the 2019 Copa América in Brazil, however he once again failed to appear during the tournament.

Career statistics

International
Updated 15 June 2018

Honors

Club
Defensor Sporting
 Uruguayan Primera División: 2007–08
 Runner-up 2005, 2008–09, 2010–11

Olimpia
 Paraguayan Primera División - Clausura: 2011
 Paraguayan Primera División - Aggregate: 2011
 Copa Libertadores runner-up: 2013

 Vasco da Gama
 Campeonato Carioca: 2015, 2016

International
Uruguay
Copa América: 2011

Individual
South American Goalkeeper of the Year: 2013
 Campeonato Carioca Team of the year: 2016, 2017

References

External links
Statistics at ESPN Soccernet
Profile at Major League Soccer
Martín Silva at Fox Sports
Martín Silva at Olympic.org

1983 births
Living people
Footballers from Montevideo
Uruguayan footballers
Uruguayan people of Galician descent
Uruguayan expatriate footballers
Uruguay international footballers
Uruguay under-20 international footballers
Association football goalkeepers
Defensor Sporting players
Club Olimpia footballers
CR Vasco da Gama players
Club Libertad footballers
Uruguayan Primera División players
Campeonato Brasileiro Série A players
Campeonato Brasileiro Série B players
Paraguayan Primera División players
Expatriate footballers in Paraguay
Expatriate footballers in Brazil
Uruguayan expatriate sportspeople in Paraguay
Uruguayan expatriate sportspeople in Brazil
2010 FIFA World Cup players
2011 Copa América players
2013 FIFA Confederations Cup players
2014 FIFA World Cup players
2015 Copa América players
Copa América Centenario players
2018 FIFA World Cup players
2019 Copa América players
Copa América-winning players